Rajendra Kumar Rai (born 6 April 1957) is an Indian politician and member of the Bhartiya Janta Party. Rai was a member of the Chhattisgarh Legislative Assembly from the Gunderdehi constituency in Balod district from 2013-18.

On 2 March 2017, the Chhattisgarh Legislative Assembly passed a censure motion against Rai for "unparliamentary" behavior.

References 

People from Balod district
Indian National Congress politicians
Janta Congress Chhattisgarh politicians
Chhattisgarh MLAs 2013–2018
Living people
21st-century Indian politicians
1957 births